The Voice of the City is a 1929 American Pre-Code film by Willard Mack and starring Robert Ames. Modeled on a stage play, it is not related to the story of the same name by O. Henry.

The film became available on DVD on January 31, 2012 from the Warner Archive collection.

Premise
A young man is accused of murder and a master detective is set to track him down and uncover conclusive evidence of his guilt, but the more he works on the case, the more he becomes convinced that the accused is not the real killer. He discovers that the murder was committed by a notorious gangster who's attempting to frame the boy.

Cast
Robert Ames - Bobby Doyle
Jim Farley - Inspector Wilmot
Sylvia Field - Beebe
Willard Mack - Detective Biff Myers
Clark Marshall - Johnny the Hop aka Snow Bird
Duane Thompson - Mary Doyle
Tom McGuire - Detective Kelly
John Miljan - Don Wilkes
Alice Moe - Martha
Beatrice Banyard - Betsy

References

External links
 
Voice of the City; allmovie.com/ synopsis

1929 films
American films based on plays
American detective films
American mystery films
American black-and-white films
Metro-Goldwyn-Mayer films
1920s English-language films
1929 crime films
American crime films
1929 mystery films
Films directed by Willard Mack
1920s American films